Rudolf Haidegger (10 July 1923 – 22 June 1987) was an Austrian sprinter. He competed in the men's 400 metres at the 1952 Summer Olympics.

References

1923 births
1987 deaths
Athletes (track and field) at the 1952 Summer Olympics
Austrian male sprinters
Austrian male hurdlers
Olympic athletes of Austria
Place of birth missing